St. Lucy's Priory High School is a private, Roman Catholic, all-girls high school in Glendora, California, built in 1963.  It is located in the Roman Catholic Archdiocese of Los Angeles and overseen by the Benedictine Sisters of St. Lucy's Priory.

Enrollment
Admission is based on STS High School Placement Test scores, grades, recommendations, and personal interviews. The 2009–2010 enrollment is 753 students with a senior class of 195. The school population is 78% Catholic and 68% minority (5% Asian/Pacific Islander; 8% Filipino; 3% African American; 39% Hispanic; 22% multiracial). The student-teacher ratio is 21–1.

Accreditation
St. Lucy's Priory High School is accredited by the Western Association of Schools and Colleges, a regional accrediting association recognized by the California Office of Education and the National Commission of Accrediting. St. Lucy's was first accredited in 1967 and has been accredited through 2014. St. Lucy's Priory High School is also accredited by the Western Catholic Educational Association and by the Board of Admissions and Relations with Schools of the University of California.

Academics
St. Lucy's Priory High School provides a college preparatory academic program that aims to produce high achieving, critical thinking, motivated scholars.  Since the 2012–2013 school year, St. Lucy's has mandated seven classes, offering science to freshmen and making students more competitive for college.  Honors classes are offered as are nine Advanced Placement classes: AP English Language, AP English Literature, AP French IV, AP Spanish IV, AP Calculus AB, AP Biology, AP European History, AP United States History, and AP United States Government and Politics.  A variety of electives are offered at the school such as six levels of Studio Arts, three levels of Dance, two levels of Chorus, Theater Arts, Advanced Drama, Production and Competition, Music Theory, Journalism, Yearbook, California Literature and History, Computer Science, World Geography and Cultures, Statistics and Probability, Creative Writing, Women in Literature, Individual Exercise, World Religions, Art Appreciation, Contemporary Media, Physiology I, Physiology II, Environmental Science, three Levels of Applied Psychology and two levels of Sewing.

Extracurricular
As a member of the California Interscholastic Federation (CIF) and the Baseline League, St. Lucy's fields varsity teams in tennis, cross-country, volleyball, golf, soccer, basketball, water polo, softball, equestrian team, track and swimming. Other extracurricular activities include A.S.B., National Honor Society, California Scholarship Federation, KIWINS, Junior Statesmen of America, Drama Club, Social Issues Club, Thirst Project, Recycling Club, Spring Musical, Science Olympiad Team, Science Club, Language Club, Music for the Masses, and Regiment and Band for Damien High School.

Controversy
In July 2013, it was revealed that St. Lucy's had terminated the employment of a teacher who had married a partner of the same sex, following changes to California's marriage law. Ken Bencomo had taught at the school for 17 years, but had his contract terminated by Assistant Principal Sister Helen Dziuk after a photograph of the marriage appeared in a local newspaper. He was told that making his marriage public violated his contract.

Bencomo said that his sexual orientation had been known by St. Lucy's.  According to a statement released by the school, St. Lucy's "does not discriminate against teachers or other school employees based on their private lifestyle choices, [but] public displays of behavior that are directly contrary to church teachings are inconsistent with these values." The statement added, "These values are incorporated into the contractual obligations of each of our instructors and other employees."

A public petition was launched by alumnae and the St. Lucy's community calling for Bencomo's reinstatement, which proved unsuccessful. He now teaches at a charter school in Pomona, California.

Notable alumnae
 Effie T. Brown '89, motion picture and television producer

References

External links

 School website

Glendora, California
Roman Catholic secondary schools in Los Angeles County, California
Benedictine secondary schools
Educational institutions established in 1963
1963 establishments in California
Catholic secondary schools in California
Girls' schools in California